Charles Roy Stuart-Vernon, Laird MacKinnon of Dunakin (1924 in Scotland – 2005 in Scotland), was a prolific British writer. He wrote historical books and novels of diverse genres under various pseudonyms: Charles Stuart, Charles MacKinnon, Charles MacKinnon of Dunakin, C. R. MacKinnon of Dunakin, C. R. MacKinnon, Graham Montrose, Iain Torr, I. Torr, Vivian Stuart, Vivian Donald and Barbara Lynn.

Biography
Charles Roy Stuart-Vernon, F.R.S.A., F.S.A.(Scot.), born in 1924 in Scotland, was hereditary chieftain and laird of Dunakin and of Dunakin Castle, Isle of Skye;  and hereditary  seanchaidh of the Clan MacKinnon. He served as Flight Lieutenant in the R.A.F.

Bibliography

As Charles MacKinnon of Dunakin

Non-fiction books
 The Clan MacKinnon: A short history (1958)
 Tartans and Highland Dress (1960)
 The Highlands in History (1961)
 Scotland's Heraldry (1962)
 The Observer's Book of Heraldry (1966)
 The Scottish Highlanders: A Personal View (1984)

As Vivian Donald

Single novels
 Better a Neighbour	(1962)
 A Far Cry	(1963)
 Love Comes to Lochieburn	(1966)
 Highland Reel	(1967)
 Island Paradise	(1968)
 Love On Location	(1968)
 The Roots of Love	(1970)
 The Laird and the Lady	(1972)
 The Happy Isle	(1972)
 The Lady Ambassador	(1972)
 Royal Scot	(1972)
 A Royal Affair	(1972)
 The Crock of Gold	(1973)
 For Love or Money	(1973)
 Cathy's Choice	(1978)
 Love Royal	(1978)
 Julie's Girl	(1978)
 Elizabeth in Love	(1979)

As Iain Torr

Single novels
 Westering Home	(1963)
 The Hills of Home	(1964)
 A Time for Change	(1965)
 No Room for Love	(1966)
 When I Give	(1966)
 Sundown	(1968)
 The Long Road Home	(1969)
 Haven of Peace	(1970)
 Janie	(1974)

As Charles Stuart

Single novels
 Highland Fling	(1964)
 Cupids and Coronets	(1974)
 The Happy Hostage	(1975)
 The Sun in Her Heart	(1975)
 Palmer's Court	(1975)
 Blood's Bride	(1975)

As Graham Montrose

Band of Angels Series
 Angel of No Mercy	(1968)
 Angel of Death	(1968)
 Where Angel Treads	(1969)
 Angel Abroad	(1969)
 Angel of Vengeance	(1970)
 Angel in Paradise	(1970)
 Send for Angel	(1970)
 Ask an Angel	(1970)
 Angel and the Nero	(1971)
 Fanfare for Angel	(1971)
 Angel at Arms	(1971)
 Angel and the Red Admiral	(1972)

Single novels
 A Matter of Motive	(1969)

As I. Torr

Single novels
 Love Finds the Way	(1972)

Charles MacKinnon

Castlemore Series
 Castlemore	(1973)
 A House at War	(1973)
 The Years Beyond	(1974)

Single novels
 Mereford Tapestry	(1974)
 The Matriarch	(1975)
 Farthingale's Folly	(1977)

As Vivian Stuart

Single novels
 Darnley's Bride	(1976)
 The New Mrs. Aldrich	(1976)
 The Darkness of Love	(1977)

As Barbara Lynn

Single novels
Tender Longings	(1978)

References and sources

1924 births
2005 deaths
20th-century Scottish novelists
Scottish romantic fiction writers